jQuery UI is a collection of GUI widgets, animated visual effects, and themes implemented with jQuery (a JavaScript library), Cascading Style Sheets, and HTML. Using the Shodan search engine query term cpe:"cpe:/a:jquery/jquery_ui" we can determine that jQuery UI is used on approximately 800k web sites. Pinterest, PayPal, IMDb, The Huffington Post, and Netflix are utilizing the library.

Both jQuery and jQuery UI are free and open-source software distributed by the jQuery Foundation under the MIT License; jQuery UI was first published in September 2007.

As of October 7, 2021 jQuery UI is in maintenance mode, with no new features being planned.

Features
As of the 1.11.4 release,  interactions such as draggable/droppable and sortable are supported. jQueryUI comes with fully themeable widgets using a consolidated, coordinated theme mechanism, such as Autocomplete, Datepicker, ProgressBar, Sliders, and more.
Effects include color animations, class toggling.

Example 
// Make the element with id "draggable" draggable
$(function () {
	$("#draggable").draggable();
});

<div id="draggable">
	<p>Drag me around</p>
</div>

This makes the div with the ID "draggable" draggable by the user's mouse.

See also 

 JavaScript framework
 JavaScript library

References

Further reading

External links
 

JavaScript libraries
2006 software
Software using the MIT license
CSS frameworks
Drupal